Pangaeus bilineatus, the peanut burrower bug, is a species of burrowing bug in the family Cydnidae. It is found in the Caribbean Sea, Central America, and North America.

References

External links

 

Cydnidae
Articles created by Qbugbot
Insects described in 1825